Step to the Rear may refer to:

 "Step to the Rear", a song from the 1967 musical How Now, Dow Jones
 "Step to the Rear", a song by Brand Nubian from the 1990 album One for All

See also
 "The Fighting Gamecocks Lead the Way", a school fight song based on the 1967 song